Pedro Felipe Valencia López (5 June 1931 – 25 August 2000) was a Colombian politician. A Conservative party politician, he was the son of Guillermo León Valencia Muñóz who was President of Colombia between 1962 and 1966. As a diplomat he served as Ambassador of Colombia to Japan, First Secretary of Colombia in Brussels, Counsellor and Chargé d'Affaires in London, and Delegate of the Federación Nacional de Cafeteros de Colombia to Spain and Portugal.

References

1931 births
2000 deaths
People from Popayán
Pedro
Children of presidents of Colombia
Alumni of the Royal Agricultural University
Colombian agronomists
Colombian Conservative Party politicians
Ambassadors of Colombia to Japan
20th-century agronomists